William Mays Eyre (born July 21, 1978) is a former Major League Baseball relief pitcher. He played for the Minnesota Twins, Texas Rangers and Baltimore Orioles.

Baseball career

High school & college
Eyre was All-State at Cyprus High School (UT).

Minnesota Twins
Eyre was drafted in the 23rd round of the 1999 Major League Baseball Draft by the Minnesota Twins.

He made his major league debut for the Twins on April 6, 2006, but was nontendered by the Twins on December 12, 2006, making him a free agent.

Texas Rangers
The Texas Rangers signed Eyre to a minor league contract with an invitation to spring training. He returned to the Rangers bullpen for 2009. He spent all of 2010 with the AAA Oklahoma City RedHawks and then became a free agent.

Oakland Athletics
On November 5, 2010, Eyre signed a minor league contract with the Oakland Athletics.

Baltimore Orioles
Eyre opted out of his contract in July 2011 and signed a minor league contract with the Baltimore Orioles. He was designated for assignment on December 8, 2011, but was shortly re-signed to a minor league contract. On June 12, 2012 he was released by the Baltimore Orioles.

Return to Texas Rangers
Following his release from the Orioles organization, on June 19, 2012 Eyre signed a minor-league contract with the Texas Rangers - the organization with whom he pitched in the minor and major leagues from 2007 through 2010 -  and resumed pitching in relief for their AAA affiliate, the Round Rock Express, the next day.,

Personal life and family
Eyre was named after Willie Mays by his mother, who was an admirer of the Hall of Fame center fielder despite being a Los Angeles Dodgers fan. He is the brother of Scott Eyre, a retired major league relief pitcher. He also has a younger brother, Robert Grace, who is playing in the minor leagues for the San Francisco Giants organization. He is married and has four children; two girls and two boys.

References

External links

1978 births
Living people
Minnesota Twins players
Texas Rangers players
Baltimore Orioles players
Baseball players from California
Major League Baseball pitchers
Elizabethton Twins players
Quad Cities River Bandits players
Fort Myers Miracle players
New Britain Rock Cats players
Rochester Red Wings players
Oklahoma RedHawks players
Oklahoma City RedHawks players
Sacramento River Cats players
Norfolk Tides players
Round Rock Express players
Utah State Eastern Golden Eagles baseball players